Nuha (deity), a deity worshipped among the Northern Arabian tribes of pre-Islamic Arabia 
Shaki, Azerbaijan, a city in northwestern Azerbaijan also known as Nukha
Noha, a Shia lament.